Operation Pax is a 1951 mystery thriller novel by the British writer Michael Innes. It is the twelfth entry in his series featuring John Appleby, a detective in the Metropolitan Police. The novel is thematically a thriller rather than the traditional Golden Age of Detective Fiction murder investigation that features in most of the series. As with other books in the series a farcical tone is often maintained. It was released in the United States under the alternative title The Paper Thunderbolt.

Synopsis
A small-time confidence trickster on the run, stumbles across a sinister organisation based at a manor house in the Cotswolds, using a high-class clinic as a front for their more dishonest activities. About to be killed by them, he manages to turn the tables, steal their formula and make an escape. Pursued by his ruthless adversaries, he manages to reach Oxford and stash the stolen formula in the Bodleian Library before he is recaptured. Coincidentally Appleby is also in the city, called in by his younger sister Jane to find her fiancée, an undergraduate who is gone missing. It turns out that he has vanished in the vicinity of the manor house, as has a refugee Austrian doctor and her young son.

Only when Jane penetrates the facility, does she discover the full extent of the scheme. While the confidence trickster had thought it was an alchemist's operation to produce gold or at the very least forged five pound notes, it is in fact a developing a brainwashing technique that destroys any sense of human independence or resistance. The scheme is codenamed Operation Pax.

References

Bibliography
 Hubin, Allen J. Crime Fiction, 1749-1980: A Comprehensive Bibliography. Garland Publishing, 1984.
 Reilly, John M. Twentieth Century Crime & Mystery Writers. Springer, 2015.
 Scheper, George L. Michael Innes. Ungar, 1986.

1951 British novels
British mystery novels
British crime novels
British thriller novels
Novels by Michael Innes
Novels set in Oxford
Novels set in Oxfordshire
British detective novels
Victor Gollancz Ltd books